The season 2003–04 of Segunda División B of Spanish football started August 2003 and ended May 2004.

Summary before the 2003–04 season 
Playoffs de Ascenso:

 Universidad de Las Palmas
 Zamora
 Lanzarote
 Pontevedra
 Real Unión
 Barakaldo
 Logroñés
 Athletic Bilbao B
 Castellón
 Barcelona B
 Burgos
 Gramenet 
 Algeciras (P) 
 Málaga B (P) 
 Ciudad de Murcia (P) 
 Cádiz (P) 

Relegated from Segunda División:

 Compostela
 Racing Ferrol
 Oviedo (relegated to Tercera División)
 Badajoz

Promoted from Tercera División:

 Girona (from Group 5)
 Villajoyosa (from Group 6)
 San Sebastián de los Reyes (from Group 7)
 Fuenlabrada (from Group 7)
 Rayo Majadahonda (from Group 7)
 Palencia (from Group 8)
 Marbella (from Group 9)
 Los Palacios (from Group 10)
 Vecindario (from Group 12)
 Lorca Deportiva (from Group 13)
 Yeclano (from Group 13)
 Villanovense (from Group 14)
 Mirandés (from Group 15)
 Alfaro (from Group 15)
 Recreación (from Group 15)
 Casetas (from Group 16)
 Tomelloso (from Group 17)

Relegated:

 Marino de Luanco
 Lugo
 Real Ávila
 Ribadesella
 Gernika
 Noja
 Peralta
 Binéfar
 Gavà
 Reus
 L'Hospitalet
 Orihuela
 Díter Zafra
 Moralo
 Torredonjimeno
 Motril
 Langreo

Administrative relegation:
 Aurrerá (financial trouble)

Occupied the vacant spots by administrative relegations:
 Caudal (occupied the vacant spot of Real Oviedo)
 Real Sociedad B (occupied the vacant spot of Aurrerá)

Group I
Teams from Asturias, Basque Country, Cantabria, Galicia, La Rioja and Navarre.

Teams

League table

Results

Top goalscorers

Group II
Teams from Aragon, Castilla–La Mancha, Castile and León, Community of Madrid and Galicia.

Teams
{{Location map+ |Spain |width=500|float=right |caption=Location of teams in Segunda División B Gr. 2 2003–04 |places=

League table

Results

Top goalscorers

Group III
Teams from Balearic Islands, Catalonia, Region of Murcia and Valencian Community.

Teams
{{Location map+ |Spain |width=500|float=right |caption=Location of teams in Segunda División B Gr. 3 2003–04 |places=

League table

Results

Top goalscorers

Group IV
Teams from Andalucia, Canary Islands, Ceuta, Extremadura and Melilla.

Teams

League table

Results

Top goalscorers

Play-out

Semi-final

Final

External links
Futbolme.com

 
Segunda División B seasons

3
Spain